Kimberly A. Yuracko (born 1969) is an American law professor and academic administrator.  She is  Judd and Mary Morris Leighton Professor of Law at Northwestern University and Associate Provost for Academic Projects.  She previously served as Dean of the Law School. She is an expert on gender and title IX.

Career 
Yuracko graduated from Stanford Law School with a Juris Doctor in 1998.  And also obtained a Doctor of Philosophy in political science from Stanford University.  She clerked in the federal court in Los Angeles for Judge Gary L. Taylor, and later for Judge Stanley Marcus, in the U.S. Court of Appeals for the Eleventh Circuit.

In 2002, she joined the law faculty of Northwestern and has held a joint appointment in political science with the university's college of arts and sciences.  She was associate dean for academic affairs from 2009 to 2010 and served as interim dean in 2011. In 2018, she was appointed dean of the law school. With effect from 1 August 2020 she was appointed Associate Provost for Academic Projects.

Personal life
Yuracko is married to professor and novelist, Michael Barsa. They have two children.

Works 
 
 
 Mark A Rothstein; Lance Liebman; Kimberly A Yuracko, Employment law : cases and materials, St. Paul, MN : Foundation Press, Thomson Reuters, 2015. Eighth edition. ,

References

External links 

Faculty profile

Living people
Stanford Law School alumni
Northwestern University Pritzker School of Law faculty
1969 births
American women legal scholars
Women deans (academic)
Deans of law schools in the United States